Gan Yetao (1907–2002) was a Chinese diplomat. He was born in Wuhu, Anhui. He was Ambassador of the People's Republic of China to Finland (1959–1962), Afghanistan (1973–1976) and Madagascar (1979–1982).

1907 births
2002 deaths
Ambassadors of China to Finland
Ambassadors of China to Afghanistan
Ambassadors of China to Madagascar
People from Wuhu